Lieutenant général des Armées navales was a naval rank in the French Navy during the ancien Régime and until the French Revolution.

History 
Cardinal Mazarin created the rank of Lieutenant général des Armées navales in 1652, as an immediate subordinate of the Vice-Admirals, tasked with managing the Chefs d'escadre of the Flotte du Ponant in Brest. In 1654, a second position of Lieutenant général was created for the Levant Fleet in Toulon.

The rank was changed into Vice-amiral around 1792.

Sources and references 
 Notes

Citations

References
 

Military ranks of France
Navy of the Ancien Régime
Naval ranks